Andeancistrus eschwartzae is a species of catfish in the family Loricariidae. It is a freshwater fish native to South America, where it occurs in the Amundalo River, which is part of the Pastaza River drainage basin in Ecuador. The species reaches 14.4 cm (5.7 inches) SL and it is named after Eugenia Schwartz, who is noted to have supported the research needed to describe the species.

References 

Ancistrini
Fish described in 2015
Catfish of South America